"Toxicity" is a single by Armenian-American heavy metal band System of a Down, released in 2002. It was originally released on the album of the same name. The writing credit for the song is Malakian/Odadjian/Tankian/Dolmayan. It is known for its dynamic chorus, aggressive vocals, and prominent drum beat. The guitar during the verse plays in  using a 2+2+2 phrasing while the heavy part ("somewhere between the sacred silence and sleep") makes use of a hemiola with the guitar switching to a 3+3+3+3 pattern while the drums remain in compound duple meter until the bridge. The song was ranked number 14 on VH1's 40 Greatest Metal Songs, and was called a nu metal classic by Stylus Magazine.

Awards
The song made number 53 on the Y2KROQ Top 200 Songs of the Century.

Music video
The video was directed by Marcos Siega and Shavo Odadjian. The beginning of the video shows the Hollywood Walk of Fame then cuts to the band. Daron Malakian can be seen wearing a Los Angeles Kings jersey with his last name on the back most of the time in the video. A closeup from behind John Dolmayan's drum kit reveals a double bass pedal attachment even though he doesn't use it during the song. During the verses, a projector shows homeless people lined against the streets. After the second chorus, Daron is seen playing the fast riff in fast motion while the band freezes and a crowd slowly appears. The rest of the band resumes as they all come in. The crowd sings along with the band as well as forming a circle pit both in the light and in the dark with glow-sticks. Similar to a scene in the last video where the band was literally eating "chop suey", this time they are eating seeds, corresponding with the lyrics "Eating seeds as a pastime activity". The final shot of the video is of the Milky Way.

As of February 2023, the song has 744 million views on YouTube.

Track listing

Charts

Certifications

Notes

2002 singles
American Recordings (record label) singles
Music videos directed by Marcos Siega
Song recordings produced by Rick Rubin
System of a Down songs
Songs written by Daron Malakian
Songs written by Serj Tankian
2002 songs